Miguel Ángel Ruiz Macías (born August 27, 1952), better known as Don Miguel Ruiz, is a Mexican author of Toltec spiritualist and neoshamanistic texts.

His work is best-received among members of the New Thought movement that focuses on ancient teachings as  a means to achieve spiritual enlightenment. Ruiz is listed as one of the Watkins 100 Most Spiritually Influential Living People in 2018. Some have associated Ruiz's work with Carlos Castaneda, author of The Teachings of Don Juan.

Biography
Don Miguel Ruiz was born in rural Mexico, the youngest of 13 children. He attended medical school, and became a surgeon.

The Four Agreements, published in 1997; was a New York Times bestseller for more than a decade. Other books have followed: The Mastery of Love, The Voice of Knowledge, The Circle of Fire, The Four Agreements Companion Book and The Fifth Agreement, a collaboration with his son Don José. His The Toltec Art of Life and Death was published in late 2015.

Works
 The Four Agreements: A Practical Guide to Personal Freedom (A Toltec Wisdom Book), 1997, Amber-Allen Publishing, 
 The Mastery of Love: A Practical Guide to the Art of Relationship (A Toltec Wisdom Book), 1999, Amber-Allen Publishing, 
 The Four Agreements Companion Book: Using The Four Agreements to Master the Dream of Your Life (A Toltec Wisdom Book)", 2000, Amber-Allen Publishing, 
 The Circle of Fire (Toltec Wisdom), 2001, Amber-Allen Publishing, 
 Wisdom from the Four Agreements (Charming Petites), 2003, Peter Pauper Press, 
 Wisdom from the Mastery of Love (Charming Petites), 2003, Peter Pauper Press, 
 The Voice of Knowledge: A Practical Guide To Inner Peace, 2004, Amber-Allen Publishing, 
 The Fifth Agreement: A Practical Guide to Self-Mastery, 2010, Amber-Allen Publishing, 
 The Toltec Art of Life and Death: A Story of Discovery, 2015, HarperCollins, The Three Questions, 2018, HarperCollins, The Wisdom of the Shamans'', 2019, Hierophant Publishing,

References

External links

 Toltec Teachings of Don Miguel Ruiz
 "The Four Agreements for a Better Life" Online Course
 The Five Agreements | An Introduction 

Mexican self-help writers
Mexican spiritual writers
Motivational writers
1952 births
Living people
Mexican animists
Neoshamanism
Heart transplant recipients
Mexican modern pagans
Modern pagan writers
Mexican surgeons